Harry Woodburn Chase (April 11, 1883 – April 20, 1955) was the 12th President of the University of North Carolina (1919–1930), the 7th President of the University of Illinois (1930–1933), and the 8th President of New York University (1933–1951).

References

External links

 

1883 births
1955 deaths
Leaders of the University of Illinois
Leaders of the University of North Carolina at Chapel Hill
People from Groveland, Massachusetts
Presidents of New York University
20th-century American academics